There are ten counties in the U.S. state of New Hampshire. Five of the counties were created in 1769, when New Hampshire was still an English colony and not a state, during the first subdivision of the state into counties. The last counties created were Belknap County and Carroll County, in 1840.

The majority of New Hampshire's counties were named for prominent British or American people or geographic locations and features. Only one county's name originates in a Native American language: Coös County, named for an Algonquian word meaning "small pines".

The counties tend to be smaller in land area towards the southern end of the state, where New Hampshire population is concentrated, and larger in land area in the less populous north.

The FIPS county code is the five-digit Federal Information Processing Standard (FIPS) code which uniquely identifies counties and county equivalents in the United States.  The three-digit number is unique to each individual county within a state, but to be unique within the entire United States, it must be prefixed by the state code.  This means that, for example, while Belknap County, New Hampshire is 001, Addison County, Vermont and Alachua County, Florida are also 001.  To uniquely identify Belknap County, New Hampshire, one must use the state code of 33 plus the county code of 001; therefore, the unique nationwide identifier for Belknap County, New Hampshire is 33001. The links in the column FIPS County Code are to the Census Bureau Info page for that county.

List

References

 
New Hampshire
Counties